The 1936 United States Senate election in Illinois took place on November 3, 1936. Incumbent Democrat J. Hamilton Lewis was elected to a second consecutive, and third overall, term as United States senator.

Election information
The primaries and general election coincided with those for other federal (president and House) and those for state elections. The primaries were held April 14, 1936.

Democratic primary

Candidates
C. H. Kavanagh	
J. Hamilton Lewis, incumbent U.S. Senator
Ruth R. McNamara

Results

Republican primary

Candidates
William J. Baker
Otis F. Glenn, former U.S. Senator
William E. Hull, former U.S. congressman
Willie A. Overholser
Orville J. Taylor

Results

General election

See also
1936 United States Senate elections

References

1936
Illinois
United States Senate